WQTZ-LP was a Religious Full Service formatted broadcast radio station formerly licensed to Hico, West Virginia, serving the Oak Hill/Fayetteville area. WQTZ-LP was owned by Landmark Baptist Church.

On July 25, 2017, the church's Deacon wrote to the Federal Communications Commission (FCC), asserting that their former pastor had applied for the broadcast license without the church's knowledge or authorization, and that the church was not involved in the operating of the station or benefitting from it in any way. At that time, the church asked for the license to be cancelled. The FCC cancelled the station's license on December 17, 2018.

References

External links
 106.9 Spirit FM Online
 

2014 establishments in West Virginia
Radio stations established in 2014
QTZ-LP
QTZ-LP
Defunct radio stations in the United States
Radio stations disestablished in 2018
2018 disestablishments in West Virginia
Defunct religious radio stations in the United States
QTZ-LP